Aminat Yusuf Jamal (born 27 June 1997) is a Nigerian-born Bahraini athlete specialising in the 400 metres hurdles. She represented her adopted country at the 2017 World Championships without reaching the semi-finals. Earlier that year she won two medals at the 2017 Islamic Solidarity Games.

Her personal best in the event is 56.90 seconds set in Baku in 2017.

International competitions

References

External links

1997 births
Living people
Bahraini female hurdlers
Bahraini female sprinters
Nigerian female sprinters
Nigerian female hurdlers
World Athletics Championships athletes for Bahrain
World Athletics Championships medalists
Nigerian emigrants to Bahrain
Naturalized citizens of Bahrain
Athletes (track and field) at the 2018 Asian Games
Asian Games medalists in athletics (track and field)
Asian Games silver medalists for Bahrain
Medalists at the 2018 Asian Games
Islamic Solidarity Games competitors for Bahrain
Athletes (track and field) at the 2020 Summer Olympics
Olympic athletes of Bahrain
Islamic Solidarity Games medalists in athletics